Paolo De Castro (born 2 February 1958) is an Italian politician, Minister of Agriculture, Food and Forestry Policies in the D'Alema I, D'Alema II and Prodi II cabinets.

In 2009 he was elected to the European Parliament, and served as chair of the parliament's Committee on Agriculture and Rural Development from 2009 to 2014.

He has also served as professor of Agricultural Economics at the Veterinary Medicine University of Bologna. He is married and has two sons.

Early life and career
Born in San Pietro Vernotico, Apulia, as a son of farmers; De Castro grew up on the family's 36-hectare farm. In 1980 he graduated at Bologna getting the maximum mark in Agricultural Science.

Career

Career in academia
From January 2001 to May 2004, De Castro chaired the Nomisma Economics Studies Institute. He also chaired the Qualivita Foundation and currently runs the International Agricultural Policy Magazine edited by the Informatore Agrario in Verona. He is professor at the Agriculture Academy of Bologna, the Georgofili Agricultural Economics Academy of Florence, the Agriculture Academy of Pesaro and the National Academy of Treja.

From 1996 to 1998 de Castro served as economic advisor to Prime Minister Romano Prodi and economic advisor to the Minister of Agriculture and Forestry Resources, Michele Pinto. Since 1 June to 31 December 2000 he was appointed special Advisor to the EU Commission's president. From 21 October 1998 to 25 April 2000 he served as Minister of Agriculture and Forestry Policies in both governments chaired by Massimo D'Alema.

De Castro is also scientific coordinator of the International Center for Advanced Mediterranean Agronomic Studies (CIHEAM) in Paris, and scientific Director of the Genio Rurale Magazine: a magazine on goods evaluation and territory science of Edagricole. He is also member of the Italian Agricultural Economists' Society (SIDEA) and of the European Agricultural Economics Association (EAEA).

Minister of Agriculture, Food and Forestry Policy
A candidate in the Italian general election held from 9 to 10 April 2006 in Apulia in the Olive Tree list, De Castro was elected to the XV Legislature. In May 2006 he was appointed Minister of Agriculture, Food and Forestry Policies in the government chaired by Romano Prodi.

Member of the European Parliament
De Castro became a Member of the European Parliament following the 2009 European elections. In parliament, he is a member of the Progressive Alliance of Socialists and Democrats group. Since 2009 he has since been serving on the Committee on Agriculture and Rural Development. Between 2009 and 2014, De Castro acted as the committee's chairman. In this capacity, he led the parliament's negotiations in 2013 with the Council of the European Union on the Common Agricultural Policy (CAP) budget for 2014–2020. Since 2014, he has been serving as his parliamentary group's coordinator on the committee. In 2019, he also joined the Committee on Budgets.

In addition to his committee assignments, De Castro has been a member of the parliament's delegation for relations with the United States (since 2011) and of the European Parliament Intergroup on Extreme Poverty and Human Rights. From 2009 until 2011, he was also a member of the delegation for relations with the Palestinian Legislative Council.

Other activities
 Reimagine Europa, Member of the Advisory Board

Recognition
In November 2000, President Carlo Azeglio Ciampi awarded De Castro the  merit honour.

References

External links

Personal website 
 

1958 births
Democratic Party (Italy) MEPs
Agriculture ministers of Italy
Living people
MEPs for Italy 2009–2014
21st-century Italian politicians
People from the Province of Brindisi
MEPs for Italy 2014–2019
MEPs for Italy 2019–2024
Democratic Party (Italy) politicians
Democracy is Freedom – The Daisy politicians
The Democrats (Italy) politicians